"Before I'm Over You" is a song written by Betty Sue Perry that was originally recorded by American country artist Loretta Lynn. It was released as a single in October 1963 via Decca Records.

Background and reception 
"Before I'm Over You" was recorded at the Columbia Recording Studio on February 5, 1962. Located in Nashville, Tennessee, the session was produced by renowned country music producer Owen Bradley. It was Lynn's second recording session after signing with Decca Records in 1961.

"Before I'm Over You" reached number four on the Billboard Hot Country Singles survey in 1963. The song became her second top ten single under the Decca recording label. "Before I'm Over You" was Lynn's biggest hit single up until this point in 1963. It was included on her debut studio album in 1964, Before I'm Over You.

Track listings 
7" vinyl single
 "Before I'm Over You" – 2:26
 "Where Were You" – 2:29

Charts

Weekly charts

References 

1963 songs
1963 singles
Decca Records singles
Loretta Lynn songs
Song recordings produced by Owen Bradley
Songs written by Betty Sue Perry